Norsk Høstfest (Norwegian language: "Norwegian Autumn Festival") is an annual festival held each fall in Minot, North Dakota, US. It is North America's largest Scandinavian festival.

History
The event is held on the North Dakota State Fair grounds in Minot, North Dakota. Tens of thousands of people attend to celebrate and partake in the Scandinavian culture and entertainment. Altogether it has hosted cultural touchstones from Iceland, Denmark, Norway, Sweden, Finland, Estonia, Greenland, Åland, Faroe Islands, German-speaking Europe and the Netherlands.
 
The festival was founded in 1978 by former North Dakota senator and mayor of Minot, Chester Reiten (1923-2013), and a group of friends who shared his interest in celebrating their Nordic heritage. The festival is a 501(c)3 nonprofit organization that raises funds to preserve, improve and share Scandinavian culture, heritage and educational programs.

The 2020 and 2021 editions of the Hostfest have been cancelled due to the COVID-19 global pandemic.

Activities
Highlights of the festival include announcing the annual Scandinavian-American Hall of Fame inductees. The Hall of Fame is a means of honoring those persons of Scandinavian descent in North America who have achieved greatness in their fields of endeavor and/or whose efforts have contributed significantly to the betterment of mankind.

Other honors include the selection of the annual Miss Norsk Høstfest and naming of the Chester Award, which recognizes festival excellence in five categories: artisan, exhibitor, food concessionaire, volunteer and chairman.

Norsk Høstfest features a number of Nordic exhibits with artisans, craftsmen and chefs participating.

During Høstfest week (end of September through first few days of October), presenters associated with the festival travel to the surrounding area where they introduce Nordic heritage and culture to students in an effort named "Høstfest In The Schools". Additionally, Scandinavian Youth Camp is held the weekend prior to Høstfest. Children participating in the camps also perform at the festival in events such as the Troll beauty contest, Norwegian Folk dance, Swedish Maypole dancers, and the Troll parade.

There are several headliner acts booked each night of the event, not limited to the event's Scandinavian theme. Headliners in the past have included performers from the United States, Canada and Europe.

References

Additional sources
Olson, Lori; Olson, Jim  (1995)  Norsk Hostfest: Heritage Comes Alive (Helena, Mt: Farcountry Press) 
Emch Paul Thomas  (2011) The Norsk Hostfest: A Celebration of Ethnic Food and Ethnic Identity (Dallas, TX: SIL International)

External links
Norsk Høstfest website
News of Norway  
Sons of Norway
North Dakota Horizons  
Minot Chamber of Commerce
Nordmanns-Forbundet

Cultural festivals in the United States
Danish-American culture in North Dakota
Dutch-American culture in North Dakota
Estonian-American history
Faroese diaspora
Festivals in North Dakota
Finnish-American culture in North Dakota
German-American culture in North Dakota
Icelandic-American culture in North Dakota
Norwegian-American culture in North Dakota
Norwegian migration to North America
Swedish-American culture in North Dakota
Tourist attractions in Minot, North Dakota
Scandinavian-American culture
Recurring events established in 1978
1978 establishments in North Dakota